V Hydrae (V Hya) is a carbon star in the constellation Hydra. To date perhaps uniquely in our galaxy it has plasma ejections/eruptions on a grand scale every 8.5 years caused by its near, unseen companion in an 8.5 year orbit, inferred by its ultraviolet excess and  periastron passage likely through the outer parts of the star itself.

Variability

V Hydrae is a semiregular variable star of type SRa, sometimes considered to be a Mira variable.  It pulsates with a period of 530 days and a brightness range of 1-2 magnitudes, but also shows deep fades at intervals of about 6,160 days when it may drop below magnitude 12.

Evolutionary stage
V Hydrae is a late carbon star, an asymptotic giant branch (AGB) star that has dredged up sufficient material from its interior to have more carbon in its atmosphere than oxygen. The rate of mass loss from V Hydrae indicates that it is almost at the end of the AGB stage and about to lose its atmosphere completely and form a planetary nebula.  It is sometimes considered to be a post-AGB object.

Companions
V Hydrae has a visible binary companion 46" distant. It is a magnitude 11.5 K0 giant.

V Hydrae also has an unseen companion in an 8.5 year orbit, inferred by its ultraviolet excess and eruptions associated with the periastron passage.  It has been suggested that the steep drops in brightness every 17 years or so are caused by obscuration by a cloud associated with the companion passing in front of the giant star.

Bullets

V Hydrae has high-speed outflows of material collimated into jets, and also a disk of material around the star.  Since the star itself is considered to be at the end of the Asymptotic Giant Branch (AGB) phase of evolution and starting to generate a planetary nebula, the mechanism for the ejection of this material can give key insights to the formation of planetary nebulae. The ejections have been modelled as bullets of material fired out each time the compact companion passes close to the extended giant star during a highly eccentric orbit.  The bullets are ejected in opposite directions in different orbits due to a flip-flop of the ejection mechanism. Microwave spectra of rotational transitions of carbon monoxide show that portions of the envelope, probably the jets,  are moving away from the star at 200 km/sec.   This is far faster than the ~15 km/sec stellar wind that is typically seen around AGB stars.

References

Hydra (constellation)
Carbon stars
Hydrae, V
Asymptotic-giant-branch stars
Semiregular variable stars
053085
Durchmusterung objects